This article provides a breakdown of the transportation options available in Cameroon. The options available to citizens and tourists include railways, roadways, waterways, pipelines, and airlines. These avenues of transportation are used by citizens for personal transportation, by businesses for transporting goods, and by tourists for both accessing the country and traveling while there.

Railways 

Railways in Cameroon are operated by Camrail, a subsidiary of French investment group Bolloré. As of May 2014 Camrail operated regular daily services on three routes:

 Douala - Kumba
 Douala - Yaoundé
 Yaoundé - Ngaoundéré
 Kribi - Mbalam and Nabeba in Republic of the Congo - under construction in 2022.
 Edéa - Kribi - proposed connection to deep water port.

There are no rail links with neighboring countries except Republic of the Congo.

Roadways 

Total highways: 50,000 km
Paved: 5,000 km
Unpaved: 45,000 km (2004)

Cameroon lies at a key point in the Trans-African Highway network, with three routes crossing its territory:
 Dakar-N'Djamena Highway, connecting just over the Cameroon border with the N'Djamena-Djibouti Highway
 Lagos-Mombasa Highway
 Tripoli-Cape Town Highway
Cameroon's central location in the network means that efforts to close the gaps which exist in the network across Central Africa rely on the Cameroon's participation in maintaining the network, and the network has the potential to have a profound influence on Cameroon's regional trade. Except for the several relatively good toll roads which connect major cities (all of them one-lane) roads are poorly maintained and subject to inclement weather, since only 10% of the roadways are tarred. It is likely for instance that within a decade, a great deal of trade between West Africa and Southern Africa will be moving on the network through Yaoundé.

National highways in Cameroon:

N1: Yaoundé - Bertoua - Ngaoundéré - Garoua - Maroua - Kouséri, border with Chad.
N2: Yaoundé - Mbalmayo - Ebolowa - Woleu Ntem, border with Gabon.
N3: Yaoundé - Edéa - Douala - Idenau.
N4: Yaoundé - Bafia - Bafoussam.
N5: Douala - Nkongsamba - Bafang - Bafoussam.
N6: Ejagham, border with Nigeria - Bamenda - Bafoussam - Tibati - Lokoti.
N7: Edéa - Kribi.
N8: Mutengene - Kumba - Mamfé.
N9: Mbalmayo - Nki, border with Congo.
N10: Yaoundé - Bertoua - Batouri - Kenzou, border with the Central African Republic.
N11 Bamenda Ring Road Linking, Mezam, Ngokitujia, Mbui, Boyo and Menchum

Prices of petrol rose steadily in 2007 and 2008, leading to a transport union strike in Douala on 25 February 2008. The strike quickly escalated into violent protests and spread to other major cities. The uprising finally subsided on 29 February.

Waterways 

2,090 km; of decreasing importance.  Navigation mainly on the Benue River; limited during rainy season.

Seaports and harbors 
 Douala - main port, railhead, and second largest city.
 Bonaberi - railhead to northwest
 Garoua
 Kribi - oil pipeline from Chad
 Kribi South - proposed iron ore export port, about 40 km south of Kribi.
 Tiko

Pipelines
888 km of oil line (2008)

Airports 

The main international airport is the Douala International Airport and a secondary international airport at Yaoundé Nsimalen International Airport. As of May 2014 Cameroon had regular international air connections with nearly every major international airport in West and Southwest Africa as well as several connections to Europe and East Africa.

In 2008 there were 34 airports, only 10 of which had paved runways.

 List of airports in Cameroon

Airports - with paved runways 
total:
10
over 3,047 m:
2
2,438 to 3,047 m:
4
1,524 to 2,437 m:
3
914 to 1,523 m:
1 (2008)

Airports - with unpaved runways 

total:
24
1,524 to 2,437 m:
4
914 to 1,523 m:
14
under 914 m:
6 (2008)

See also 
 Camrail
 Cameroon
 Transport News
 African Integrated High Speed Railway Network (AIHSRN)
 Railway stations in Cameroon

References 
 Sundance Resources Ltd report